Niels Destadsbader (born 19 August 1988) is a Belgian singer, television presenter and actor.

Biography 
Niels Destadsbader had roles in several Belgian TV shows including Amika, De Elfenheuvel and F.C. De Kampioenen.
Destadsbader presented many programs such as Dansdate, K3 zoekt K3, De Wensboom and many more. He released his debut album ‘Speeltijd’ on October 21st 2016.

In 2008 he participated in the competition ‘Steracteur Sterartiest’ and got to the semi finals. He has performed at Werchter Boutique, won 9 MIA's as of 2020 and won the Radio 2 Zomerhit a total of 3 times.

In 2018 he appeared in the Belgian TV show ‘Liefde voor Muziek’. 5 of the songs he made for the show reached the Flemish Top 50.

Discography

Albums

Singles

References

1988 births
Flemish male voice actors
Flemish male television actors
21st-century Belgian male singers
21st-century Belgian singers
Living people